Rainer Schlagbauer (born 24 July 1949) is an Austrian former footballer who played as a midfielder. He made two appearances for the Austria national team from 1971 to 1974.

References

External links
 

1949 births
Living people
Austrian footballers
Association football midfielders
Austria international footballers
Austrian Football Bundesliga players
1. Wiener Neustädter SC players
SK Rapid Wien players
First Vienna FC players
Place of birth missing (living people)